"Thank You for the Sunshine" is a song recorded by English singer Shakila Karim. It was released on 8 December 2012.

Background and composition
"Thank You for the Sunshine" is the fifth single by Shakila Karim. The song is dedicated to everyone who helped to make the London 2012 Olympic Games successful.

References

External links

2012 singles
2012 songs
British pop songs
Shakila Karim songs